Novosti means news in some Slavic languages, and so is the name of some news organizations and publications. It may refer to:

 RIA Novosti, Russian state-owned news agency
 Novosti AD, Serbian publishing company
 Večernje novosti (lit. Evening News), Serbian daily established in 1953 and published by the above company 
 Novosti (Croatia), Croatian weekly established in 1999 
 Moskovskiye Novosti (lit. Moscow News), defunct Russian daily which was published 1980–2008
 Posledniye Novosti, (lit. Latest News), historic Russian émigré daily published in Paris 1920–1940
 Sportske novosti (lit. Sports News), Croatian sports daily established in 1945
 Sportske novosti awards, the annual awards for highest achievements in Croatian sports